Sergei Prikhodko may refer to:
 Sergei Aleksandrovich Prikhodko (b. 1962), Soviet and Russian footballer with FC Zenit St. Petersburg, FC Rotor Volgograd and PFC CSKA Moscow
 Sergei Eduardovich Prikhodko (1957–2021), Russian politician, Russian president's aide (1997–2013) and Deputy Prime Minister
 Sergei Sergeyevich Prikhodko (b. 1984), Russian footballer with FC Chornomorets Odessa, son of Sergei Aleksandrovich